Alan McDonald, Alan MacDonald, Allan McDonald, Allan MacDonald, Allen McDonald or Allen MacDonald may refer to:

Politicians
 Al McDonald, Canadian politician
 Alan Angus McDonald (1927–2007), U.S. federal judge
 Alan McDonald, co-leader of the NZ South Island Party
 Allan McDonald (Australian politician) (1888–1953)
 Allan McDonald (New Zealand politician), New Zealand politician
 Allan MacDonald (Western Australian politician)  (1892–1978), Australian politician and government minister
 Allan MacDonald (Tasmanian politician) (1853–1898), member of the Tasmanian House of Assembly
 Allan Elliott McDonald (1903–1957), Australian politician
 Allan Macdonald (1794–1862), New York politician

Sportspeople
 Alan McDonald (Australian footballer) (1918–1999), football player for Richmond
 Alan McDonald (Northern Ireland footballer) (1963–2012), association footballer from Northern Ireland
 Alan MacDonald (rugby union) (born 1985), Scottish rugby union player
 Allan McDonald (footballer) (born 1946), Australian rules footballer
 Allan McDonald (tennis) (born 1951), Australian tennis player
 Allen MacDonald (1896–?), American football player

Other people
 Alan McDonald (minister), Moderator of the General Assembly of the Church of Scotland, 2006
 Alan MacDonald (writer) (born 1958), English children's writer
 Alsy MacDonald (Alan MacDonald, born 1961), Australian rock musician and lawyer
 Alan MacDonald (production designer) (c. 1956–2017), British production designer
 Allan McDonald (cartoonist) (born 1975), Honduran editorial cartoonist
 Allan MacDonald (poet) (1859–1905), Scottish poet and priest
 Allan H. MacDonald (born 1951), American physicist and academic
 Allan J. McDonald (1937–2021), chemical engineer, whistleblower associated with NASA's Space Shuttle Challenger disaster
 Allen MacDonald, screenwriter of American crime drama Dead Doll